Leonard Grigoryan is an Australian classical guitarist and recording artist of Armenian heritage. He is the younger brother of fellow guitarist Slava Grigoryan, with whom he often plays in a duo as the Grigoryan Brothers.

Life and career
Of Armenian heritage,  Leonard and his elder brother Slava  often play in a duo as the Grigoryan Brothers.

Leonard's first solo album, entitled Solo, was released through Which Way Music in 2012.

Discography

Albums

Awards

ARIA Awards 

The ARIA Music Awards are presented annually from 1987 by the Australian Recording Industry Association (ARIA).  Grigoryan has received 8 nominations, either as a member of Grigoryan Brothers, or shared with other artists (including his brother Slava).

|-
| |2003 || Play (Slava Grigoryan and Leonard Grigoryan) || Best Classical Album || 
|-
|| 2006 || Rodrigo Guitar Concertos  (Slava Grigoryan, Leonard Grigoryan, Queensland Orchestra, Brett Kelly) || Best Classical Album || 
|-
||  2007 || Impressions (Slava Grigoryan and Leonard Grigoryan) || Best Classical Album || 
|-
| |2009 || Distance (Slava Grigoryan and Leonard Grigoryan) || Best Classical Album || 
|-
|| 2011 || Band of Brothers (Slava Grigoryan, Leonard Grigoryan, Joseph Tawadros, James Tawadros) || Best World Music Album || 
|-
|| 2012 || My Latin Heart (Jose Carbo with Slava Grigoryan and Leonard Grigoryan) || Best Classical Album || 
|-
|| 2015 || This Time (Grigoryan Brothers) || Best Classical Album || 
|-
|| 2020 || A Boy Called Sailboat (Grigoryan Brothers) || Best Original Soundtrack, Cast or Show Album || 
|-

AIR Awards
The Australian Independent Record Awards (commonly known informally as AIR Awards) is an annual awards night to recognise, promote and celebrate the success of Australia's Independent Music sector.

|-
| AIR Awards of 2019
| Bach Concertos 
| Best Independent Classical Album
| 
|-

South Australian Music Awards
The South Australian Music Awards (previously known as the Fowler's Live Music Awards) are annual awards that exist to recognise, promote and celebrate excellence in the South Australian contemporary music industry. They commenced in 2012.
 
|-
| 2019
| Slava Grigoryan and Leonard with Beijing Duo
| Best International Collaboration
| 
|-

References

External links
The Grigoryan Brothers, Slava and Leonard's Website

Australian classical guitarists
Living people
Year of birth missing (living people)